The Pilbeam MP84 is a sports prototype race car, designed, developed and built by British manufacturer Pilbeam, for sports car racing, conforming to the FIA's LMP675/SR2 class, and produced between 1999 and 2005.

References

Sports prototypes
Le Mans Prototypes